Frederick Nicholas Thorp (born 7 March 1994) is a British actor. He starred in the action film Overdrive (2017), as well as the Netflix series Safe (2018) and Fate: The Winx Saga (2021–2022).

Early life
Thorp was born in Kensington and Chelsea, London to Nick Thorp and Antonia Manley. He has an older sister, Ophelia.

Thorp attended Summer Fields School in Oxford. Thorp later attended Eton College. He spent the summer of 2013 in New York City taking classes with the Lee Strasberg Theatre and Film Institute. That autumn, he began his studies in Psychology at the University of Exeter, where he participated in theatre through EUTCo.

Filmography

Film

Television

Stage

References

External links

Living people
1994 births
Alumni of the University of Exeter
Male actors from London
People educated at Summer Fields School
People from the Royal Borough of Kensington and Chelsea
Portman family